This is a list of notable events in music that took place in the year 1904.

Specific locations
1904 in Norwegian music

Events
January 9 - Estampes, by Claude Debussy , receives its initial performance at the Societe Nationale de Musique in Paris.
 January 13 – Béla Bartók's symphonic poem Kossuth is premiered in Budapest, becoming his first major work to be performed.
 January 21 - The Deutsches Nationaltheater in Brno premiers Leoš Janáček's Její pastorkyňa (later known as Jenufa). Libreto by the composer.
January 28 - The Russian Symphony Orchestra formed by conductor Modest Altschuler gives its first concert at Cooper Union in New York City. The orchestra is an American with Russian name, not a Russian orchestra touring America.
February 1 - Enrico Caruso records the aria Vesti la giubba from Ruggero Leoncavallo's Pagliaci for the Victor Company. This event marks his first recording in America.
 February 4 - Jules Massenet's ballet La Cigale is performed for the first time at the Opera-Comique in Paris.
 February 8 - Jean Sibelius conducts the premiere of his Violin Concerto in D Minor, Op.47 in Helsinki, Finland. Viktor Nováček is soloist.
 February 17 – Puccini's Madama Butterfly debuts at La Scala in Milan to no great acclaim. On May 28 a revised version opens in Brescia to huge success.
 February 18 - Camille Saint-Saëns's Helene premiers at Monte Carlo.
 February 28 - Symphony No.2 in B-flat Major Op.57, by Vincent d'Indy, is performed for the first time by the Lamoureux Orchestra in Paris.
 February 29 - Bela Bartok's Scherzo Burlesque for Piano and Orchestra, Op.2, premiers in Budapest.
March 2 - Emma Calve sings Carmen at the New York Metropolitan Opera. This is her farewell performance with this opera company.
 March 5 - Maurice Ravel's String Quartet in F major receives its first performance in Paris, given by the Societe Nationale de Musique. The only quartet by the composer.
 March 16 - The Halle Orchestra of Manchester gives the first performance of In the South, by Edward Elgar, conducted by the composer.
 March 18 - Anatoly Liadov's symphonic poem Baba-Yaga premiers in Saint Petersburg.
 March 21 - Tone poem Symphonia domestica, by Richard Strauss, receives its premiere at Carnegie Hall, New York City. Conducted by composer, this event also marks the composer's first visit to the Unisted States.
 March 25 - Antonín Dvořák's last opera, Armida, is produced in its original Czech version in Prague.
 March 30 - The first opera of Frederick Delius, Koanga, premieres at the Stadttheater in Elberfeld, Germany.
 April 25 - Jean Sibelius' Valse triste premieres in Helsinki, Finland, the composer conducting.
 May 10 - Hugo Alfven's rhapsody for orchestra Midsommervaka premieres in Stockholm.
 May 16 - The Diamond Jubilee of violinist Joseph Joachim's first appearance in England is celebrated at Queen's Hall, London.
 May 17 - Maurice Ravel's Sheherezade and Albert Roussel's Resurrection are premiered on the same program at a concert of the Societe Nationale de Musique in Paris.
 May 17 - Vincent d'Indy's Choral varie Op.55, a composition featuring the saxophone as solo instrument, premiers in Paris
 May 28 - A revised three-act version of Giacomo Puccini's Madama Butterfly is performed in Brescia with enormous praise.
 June 9 – The Queen's Hall Orchestra, under Sir Henry Wood, plays its first concert under its new name of the London Symphony Orchestra.
 June 15 - The first transmission of wireless telegraphy featuring music and dialogue takes place in Salzburg with Otto Nußbaumer making the transmission.
 June 27 - Raoul Laparra is awarded the first Grand Prix de Rome by the Academie des Beaux-Arts in Paris with his cantata Alyssa. Maurice Ravel was a contestant.
 July 5 - Edward Elgar is knighted in Great Britain by King Edward VII
 July 15 – Soprano Agnes Nicholls marries conductor Hamilton Harty.
 July - The Act of Touch in All Its Diversity by pianist Tobias Matthay is published in London by Longmans, Green and Co.
 September 7 - Sir Hubert Parry's choral work The Love that Casteth Out Fear premieres at the Gloucester Music Festival. This work, about the passion of Christ, has a text by the composer.
 September 12 – Pianist Ignacy Jan Paderewski gives a concert in Wellington, New Zealand.
 October
Alban Berg begins his studies under Arnold Schoenberg.
The Gramophone Company records the Bach-Gounod Ave Maria (G.C. 03033) performed by Dame Nellie Melba with Jan Kubelík on violin.
 October 16 - Pan Voyevoda, a four-act opera by Nikolai Rimsky-Korsakov, receives its first performance in Saint Petersburg.
 October 18 – Gustav Mahler's Symphony No. 5 is premiered by the Gürzenich Orchestra Cologne under the composer's baton; it is also first published this year.
 November 4 - Franco Alfano's four-act opera Risurrezione based on Tolstoi novel receives its first performance in Turin
 November 5 - Emil Oberhoffer conducts the first concert of the newly established Minneapolis Symphony Orchestra
 November 10
 Ferruccio Busoni gives the world premiere of his Piano Concerto at the Beethoven-Saal in Berlin.
 Arthur Nikisch and the Berlin Philharmonic record Ludwig van Beethoven's Symphony No.5 in C minor for the Gramophone Company. This is the first recording of a complete symphony.
 November 13 - Caprice andalou by Camille Saint-Saëns, scored for violin and orchestra, receives its initial performance in Paris
 November 16 - Samuel Coleridge-Taylor, in his first trip to America, conducts the first American performance of his The Song of Hiawatha.
 November 20 - The Hague Philharmonic Orchestra gives its inaugural concert. Conducted by Henri Viotta.
 November 22 - Pope Pius X issues his Motu proprio Tra le sollecitudini a papal document in which he puts forth rules for performance and interpretation of Gregorian chant.
 November 29 - Ernst von Dohnanyi's 4 Rhapsodies for Piano, Op.11, are premiered in Vienna, the composer performing.
 December 10 - Serge Rachmaninoff, Sergei Taneyev and Alexander Scriabin are among the winners of the first annual Glinka Award for best composition by Russian composers.
 December 13 - Ruggero Leoncavallo's opera Der Roland von Berlin (opera) premiers at Berlin. The opera is failure.
December 24
 Theodore Thomas conducts his final concert of the Chicago Orchestra.
 The Metropolitan Opera in New York City gives the first performance outside Bayreuth of Richard Wagner's Parsifal, despite copyright objections raised by Cosima and Siegried Wagner.
 December 26 - Isadora Duncan makes her Russian debut in Saint Petersburg to music by Frédéric Chopin.
 December 29 - The Seattle Symphony Orchestra gives its first concert. Conducted by Harry West at Christensen's Hall. 
 Claudio Monteverdi's opera L'Orfeo is given a modern debut in concert version in Paris.

Published popular music

 "Abraham" w. Sterling m. Von Tilzer
 "Absinthe Frappe" w. Glen MacDonough m. Victor Herbert
 "Ain't It Funny What a Difference Just a Few Hours Make" w. Henry Blossom m. Alfred G. Robyn.  Introduced by Raymond Hitchcock in the Broadway show The Yankee Consul
 "Al Fresco" w. Glen MacDonough m. Victor Herbert
 "Alexander" w. Andrew B. Sterling m. Harry Von Tilzer
 "All Aboard For Dreamland" w. Andrew B. Sterling m. Harry Von Tilzer
 "Back, Back To Baltimore" w. Harry H. Williams m. Egbert Van Alstyne
 "Big Indian Chief" w. Bob Cole m. J. Rosamond Johnson
 "Billy" w. Edgar Malone m. Ted S. Barron
 "Blue Bell" w. Edward Madden, Dolly Morse m. Theodore F. Morse
 "By The Old Oak Tree" w. George V. Hobart m. Max Hoffmann
 "Come Back To Sorrento" (Original title "Torna A Surriento") w.m. Ernesto de Curtis & Claude Aveling
 "Come Down From The Big Fig Tree" w. Edward Madden m. Theodore Morse
 "Come Take A Trip In My Airship" w. Ren Shields m. George Evans
 "Cordalia Malone" Jerome, Schwartz
 "The Countess Of Alagazam" w.m. Bob Cole
 "The Day That You Grew Colder" w.m. Paul Dresser
 "Don't Cry, Katie, Dear" Mills
 "Down In The Subway" Jerome, Schwartz
 "Down On The Brandywine" w. Vincent P. Bryan m. J. B. Mullen
 "Fascination" w. Dick Manning m. F. D. Marchetti Words 1932.
 "Fishing" w. James Weldon Johnson m. J. Rosamond Johnson
 "Following In Father's Footsteps" w.m. E. W. Rogers
 "Fu' The Noo" w. Harry Lauder & Gerald Grafton m. Harry Lauder
 "The Ghost That Never Walked" w. William Jerome m. Jean Schwartz
 "Gimme De Leavins" w. James Weldon Johnson m. Bob Cole
 "Give My Regards to Broadway" w.m. George M. Cohan
 "Good-bye Flo" w.m. George M. Cohan
 "Goodbye, Little Girl, Goodbye" w. Will D. Cobb m.. Gus Edwards
 "Goodbye, My Lady Love" w.m. Joseph E. Howard
 "The Goo-Goo Man" Stoddard, Schindler, Jerome
 "Hannah, Won't You Open That Door" w. Andrew B. Sterling m. Harry von Tilzer
 "Have You Seen Maggie Riley?" Von Tilzer
 "He Done Me Wrong" w.m. Hughie Cannon
 "Heinie" Rose, Snyder
 "I Love You All The Time" w.m. Will R. Anderson
 "I Want To Be A Soldier" w.m. William Cahill
 "I'm Longing For My Old Kentucky Home" w. Vincent Bryan m. J. B. Mullen
 "In The Days Of Old" w. Henry Blossom m. Alfred G. Robyn
 "In Zanzibar – My Little Chimpanzee" w. Will D. Cobb m. Gus Edwards
 "Just An Ever-Loving Girl" w. Vincent Bryan m. J. B. Mullen
 "Just For The Sake Of Society" w. Alfred Bryan m. Kerry Mills
 "Kiss Me Good Night, Dear Love" w.m. Malcolm Williams & Israel Zangwill
 "Let's All Go Up To Maud's" w. Joseph C. Farrell m. Kerry Mills
 "Life's a Funny Proposition After All" w.m. George M Cohan
 "A Little Boy Called "Taps"" w. Edward Madden m. Theodore F. Morse
 "The Man Behind" w. Vincent Bryan m. J. B. Mullen
 "The Man With The Ladder And Hose" w.m. T. Mayo Geary
 "La Mattinata" m. Ruggiero Leoncavallo
 "Maureen Of Ballinasloe" w. J. Francis Barron m. J. Airlie Dix
 "Meet Me in St. Louis, Louis" w. Andrew B. Sterling m. Kerry Mills
 "Mexico" w. James Weldon Johnson & Bob Cole m. Bob Cole
 "Mister Wilson, That's All" w. Henry Williams m. Egbert Van Alstyne
 "My Honey Lou" w.m. Thurland Chattaway
 "My Kangaroo" Farrell & Kohlman
 "Nan! Nan! Nan!" by Edward Madden
 "Oh Bliss! Oh Joy!" Mullen
 "Oh Gee! It's Great To Be Crazy" Carle, Bowers
 "Oh! Oh! Sallie" Hartlett
 "On The Warpath" Raymond A. Browne (composer)
 "One Fine Day" (Original title "Un Bel Di") w. L. Illica & G. Giacosa m. G. Puccini
 "Please Come And Play In My Yard" w. Edward Madden m. Theodore F. Morse
 "Preacher and the Bear" w.m. George Fairman
 "Saint Louis Rag" m. Tom Turpin
 "Scissors To Grind" w.m. Thomas S. Allen
 "Seminole" w. Harry Williams m. Egbert Van Alstyne
 "Shame On You" Larkin, Smith
 "She Went to the City" by Paul Dresser
 "Since Little Dolly Dimples Made A Hit" w. William Jerome m. Jean Schwartz
 "St. Louis Tickle" m. Barney & Seymore
 "The Story Of A Clothes Line"  m. James W. Tate w. Frank Clifford Harris
 "Sweet Thoughts Of Home" w. Stanislaus Stange m. Julian Edwards
 "Teasing" w. Cecil Mack m. Albert Von Tilzer
 "Those Songs My Mother Used To Sing" w.m. H. Wakefield Smith
 "Three Green Bonnets" w. Harris m. Guy d'Hardelot
 "Tippecanoe" w. Harry Williams m. Egbert Van Alstyne
 "The Trumpeter" by Francis Barron
 "What The Brass Band Played" Drislane, Morse
 "Why Adam Sinned" w.m. Alex Rogers
 "Won't You Fondle Me" w.m. James Kendis & Herman Paley
 "The Yankee Doodle Boy" w.m. George M. Cohan
 "Your Mother Wants You Home Boy" w.m. Paul Dresser

Classical music
Béla Bartók
Piano Quintet
Rhapsody, Op. 1
Hakon Børresen – Concerto for Violin and Orchestra in G major
František Alois Drdla – Souvenir in D major
Edward Elgar
 In the South
 Pomp and Circumstance March No. 3 in C minor
Alexander Glazunov – Violin Concerto in A minor
Enrique Granados – Allegro de concierto
Hamilton Harty – An Irish Symphony
Gustav Mahler – Kindertotenlieder (Songs of the Death of Children) (song-cycle)
Erkki Melartin – Sleeping Beauty, Op.22
Selim Palmgren – Piano Concerto No.1 in G minor
Max Reger – Variations and Fugue on a Theme by Hiller
Alexander Scriabin – Symphony No. 3
Cyril Scott 
Scherzo, Op.25
2 Pierrot Pieces, Op.35
2 Piano Pieces, Op.37
Petar Stojanović – Violin Concerto No. 1
Igor Stravinsky – Piano Sonata in F-sharp minor

Opera
Franco Alfano – Risurrezione
Frederick Delius - Koanga
Antonín Dvořák - Armida
Leoš Janáček – Jenůfa (Její pastorkyňa)
Ruggero Leoncavallo – Der Roland von Berlin
Giacomo Puccini – Madama Butterfly
Sergei Rachmaninoff – The Miserly Knight
Nikolai Rimski-Korsakov - Pan Voyevoda
Camille Saint-Saëns - Helene
Amedeo Vives – Bohemios

Operetta
A rátartós királykisasszony (The Haughty Princess) by Victor Jacobi.  First performed on December 17 at Budapest.

Ballet
 La Cigale by Jules Massenet's is performed for the first time at the Opera-Comique in Paris (Feb.4)

Musical theater
 The Catch of the Season London production opened at the Vaudeville Theatre on September 9 and ran for 621 performances
  The Cingalee (Lionel Monckton, Adrian Ross and Percy Greenbank) – London production opened at Daly's Theatre on March 5 and ran for 365 performances
 It Happened in Nordland Broadway production opened at the Lew M. Fields Theatre on December 5 and ran for 254 performances
 Little Johnny Jones (book, music, lyrics, direction and featuring George M. Cohan) Broadway production opened at the Liberty Theatre on November 7 and ran for 52 performances
 Paris by Night (Music: Alfred Solmon Book: Harry Marshall) Broadway production opened at the Madison Square Roof Garden on July 2 and ran for 50 performances.  Starring Ben Welch.
 The Rogers Brothers In Paris Broadway production opened at the New Amsterdam Theatre on September 5 and ran for 72 performances
 Sergeant Brue London production opened at the Strand Theatre on June 14
 The Yankee Consul Broadway production opened at the Broadway Theatre on February 22 and ran for 115 performances

Births
January 10 – Ray Bolger, singer and dancer (d. 1987)
January 13 – Richard Addinsell, composer (d. 1977)
January 15
Eddie DeLange, bandleader and lyricist (d. 1949)
Leonid Jacobson, Russian dancer, choreographer and ballet master (d. 1975)
January 18 – Anthony Galla-Rini, accordionist, composer and conductor (d. 2006)
January 22 – George Balanchine, Russian choreographer (d. 1983)
February 3 – Luigi Dallapiccola, composer (d. 1975)
February 23 – Allan Gray, film composer (d. 1973)
February 29 – Jimmy Dorsey, bandleader (d. 1957)
March 1 – Glenn Miller, trombonist and bandleader (m. 1944)
March 4 – Joseph Schmidt, Austrian-Hungarian tenor and actor (d. 1942)
March 8 – Nikos Skalkottas Greek composer (d.1949)
April 9 – Sharkey Bonano, jazz musician (d. 1972)
April 16 – Fifi D'Orsay, actress and singer (d. 1983)
April 18 – Pigmeat Markham, all-round entertainer (d. 1981)
April 29
Russ Morgan, orchestra leader (d. 1969)
Pedro Vargas, Mexican singer and actor (d. 1989)
May 21 – Fats Waller, American pianist and comedian (d. 1943)
May 23 – Libby Holman, US singer and actress (d. 1971)
May 25 – Lirt Thomas, German choral conductor (d.1973)
May 26 – George Formby, English music hall performer, singer, actor and songwriter (d. 1961)
May 28 – Margaret Harris, opera costume and set designer (d. 2000)
May 29 – León Zuckert, conductor, composer and arranger (d. 1992)
June 3 – Jan Peerce, American tenor (d. 1984)
June 6 – Raymond Burke, clarinettist (d. 1986)
June 7 – Don Murray, clarinettist (d. 1929)
June 11 – Pinetop Smith, jazz pianist (d. 1929)
June 15 – Anna Mahler, musician and sculptor (d. 1988)
June 21 – Mack Gordon, Polish-born US lyricist (d. 1959)
June 24 – Phil Harris, jazz musician (d. 1995)
July 9 – Robert Whitney, British conductor (d. 1986)
July 14 - Nadia Reisenberg, Litvian pianist (d. 1983)
July 15
Dorothy Fields, librettist and lyricist (d. 1974)
Vladimir Bourmeister, Russian dancer and choreographer (d.1971)
July 16
Goffredo Petrassi, composer (d. 2003)
Mabel Wayne - US composer (d. 1978)
July 18 – Harold Spivacke, music librarian and administrator (d. 1977)
July 24
Leo Arnaud - film composer (d. 1991)
Anton Dolin - English dancer and choreographer (d.1983)
July 26 – Jack Westrup, musicologist (d. 1975)
August 13 – Charles "Buddy" Rogers, actor and singer (d. 1989)
August 17 – Leopold Nowak, Austrian musicologist (d. 1991)
August 21 – Count Basie, bandleader (d. 1984)
September 2 - Set Svanholm, Swedish operatic tenor (d.1964)
September 17 – Sir Frederick Ashton, dancer and choreographer (d. 1988)
October 11 – Tita Merello, tango singer, dancer and actress (d. 2002)
October 20 – Anna Neagle, actress and singer (d. 1986)
October 24 – Moss Hart, musical theatre director (d. 1961)
October 26 - Boris Khaykin, Russian conductor (d.1978)
October 29 – Vivian Ellis, English composer (d. 1996)
November 1 or November 14 – Aleksey Zhivotov, composer (d. 1964)
November 14 – Dick Powell, actor and singer (d. 1963)
November 18 – Masao Koga, Japanese composer (d. 1978)
November 20 - Alexandra Danilova, Russian dancer and teacher (d.1997)
November 21 – Coleman Hawkins, saxophonist (d. 1969)
November 25 – Toni Ortelli, Italian composer and alpinist (d. 2000)
December 9 – Elsie Randolph, English actress, dancer and singer (d. 1982)
December 18 – Wilf Carter, country singer (d. 1966)
December 26 – Alejo Carpentier, musicologist (d. 1980)
December 30 - Dmitry Kabalevsky, Soviet pianist and composer (d.1987)
December 31
Umm Kulthum, Egyptian singer and actress (d. 1975)
Nathan Milstein, Russian violinist (d.1992)

Deaths
January 2 - Peter Jurgenson, Russian music publisher (b.1836)
January 4 – Mitrofan Belyayev, music publisher (b. 1836) 
January 10 – Antoinette Sterling, singer
January 15 – Eduard Lassen, composer (b. 1830)
January 20 – Maria Louisa Bustill, mother of Paul Robeson (b. 1853) (domestic accident)
February 8 – Malvina Garrigues, soprano and composer (b. 1825)
March 10 – Giovanni Cesari, castrato singer (b. 1843)
March 11 – Charles Grisart, opera composer (b. 1837)
March 20 – Louisa Pyne, operatic soprano and opera company manager (b. 1832)
March 31 – Sophia Karp, actress and singer (b. 1861)
February 8 - Malwine Schnorr von Varolsfeld, German soprano (b.1825)
April 29 – Nellie Farren, burlesque actress and singer (b. 1848)
May 1 – Antonín Dvořák, Czech composer (b. 1841)
May 14 – Morrison Foster, editor and brother to Stephen Foster (born 1823)
May 19 – Korla Awgust Kocor, conductor and composer (b. 1822)
May 30 – Laura Joyce Bell, contralto singer and actress (b. 1854) 
June 28 – Dan Emmett, founder of the Virginia Minstrels (b. 1815)
July 13 – Giulia Warwick, operatic soprano and actress (b. 1857)
July 20 – Arthur Lloyd, music hall entertainer and songwriter (b. 1839)
August 6 – Eduard Hanslick, music critic (b. 1825)
September 26 – Patrick Lafcadio Hearn, translator (born 1850)
October 31 – Dan Leno, English music hall comedian, clog dancer and singer (b. 1860)
November 30 – Aldine Silliman Kieffer, music teacher and publisher (b. 1840)
date unknown – Antonio Galassi, operatic baritone (b. 1845)

References

 
20th century in music
Music by year